Metztli Obscura is the third full-length album by the Mexican death metal band Hacavitz. This is the last album to feature Oscar Garcia on drums and percussion.

Track listing

Credits
Antimo Buonnano - guitar, bass, vocals
Oscar Garcia - drums, percussion
Engineered, mixed and mastered by J. Carlos Padilla
Produced by Hacavitz and J. Carlos Padilla
All music and Lyrics by Hacavitz 
Guest vocals in "Towards Black Pest" by Shyaithan (Impiety)
Cover art by Santiago Armengod
Layout by Arthur Axegrinder

2010 albums
Hacavitz (band) albums